The white-spotted tree frog (Boana albopunctata) is a species of frog in the family Hylidae found in Argentina, Bolivia, Brazil, Paraguay, and Uruguay. Its natural habitats are moist savanna, subtropical or tropical moist shrubland, subtropical or tropical high-altitude shrubland, intermittent rivers, intermittent freshwater lakes, freshwater marshes, intermittent freshwater marshes, and urban areas.

References
 Aquino, L., Bastos, R., Kwet, A., Reichle, S., Silvano, D., Azevedo-Ramos, C., Scott, N. & Baldo, D. 2004.  Hypsiboas albopunctatus.   2006 IUCN Red List of Threatened Species.   Downloaded on 21 July 2007.

White-spotted tree frog
Amphibians described in 1824
Taxonomy articles created by Polbot